Ivone is a given name. Notable people, both men and women, with the name include:

 Dona Ivone Lara (born 1921), Brazilian singer
 Ivone De Franceschi (born 1974), Italian footballer
 Ivone Gebara (born 1944), Brazilian feminist theologian
 Ivone Kirkpatrick (1897-1964), British diplomat
 Ivone Ramos (born 1926), Cape Verdean writer

Feminine given names